The 2007 Georgia Bulldogs football team competed on behalf of the University of Georgia in American football against teams from other colleges and universities. The Bulldogs tied for first place in the Eastern Division of the Southeastern Conference (SEC) but lost a tie-breaker with the University of Tennessee. The team finished its season by defeating the Hawaii Warriors in the 2008 Sugar Bowl. This was the Georgia Bulldogs' seventh season under the guidance of head coach Mark Richt.

Preseason 
Two key players from the 2006 season, defensive end Charles Johnson and running back Danny Ware, decided to leave school early to enter the NFL draft. Another junior, defensive back Paul Oliver, considered a move to the NFL, but decided to return to the Bulldogs for his senior year. Despite coming back for his senior year, Paul Oliver became academically ineligible and decided to enter the supplemental draft. The Bulldogs were led on offense by rising Sophomore QB Matthew Stafford. Sean Bailey and Mohammed Massaquoi led the receivers and Thomas Brown at Tailback. The defense saw the emergence of Asher Allen and Kelin Johnson in the Secondary. In addition, Dannell Ellerbe was the leader of the Linebackers while Geno Atkins and Jeff Owens anchored the Defensive Line.

Regular season 
The Bulldogs started off strong with an impressive win at home against Oklahoma State. Though, the Bulldogs failed to score a touchdown the following week against South Carolina. The Dawgs rebounded against Western Carolina and enjoyed the thrill of an overtime victory on September 22 at Alabama. This was a legendary call for Scott Howard, the new play by play announcer replacing the legendary Larry Munson. Other high moments during the season were the upset win against Florida 42-30 and the win against Auburn 45-20 as Georgia wore Black jerseys for the first time. The season ended on a high note as the Bulldogs defeated Hawaii in the Sugar Bowl in New Orleans, Louisiana 41-10. The Bulldogs crushed the undefeated Warriors and their high-potent offense lead by NCAA record-setting quarterback Colt Brennan

Rankings

Schedule 
Before the season, CNNSI.com ranked the 2007 UGA schedule the 14th hardest in the country.

Game summaries

Oklahoma State 

Sophomore quarterback Matthew Stafford threw for 234 yards and two touchdowns as the Bulldogs cruised past the Cowboys from the Big 12 in a much-hyped season opener. Georgia won its first game of the season for an 11th consecutive season.

South Carolina 

The Gamecocks took a 7-0 lead on their first drive of the game and used stifling defense to hold off the Bulldogs the rest of the way. It was Georgia's first loss in the series since 2001, and the team's fifth consecutive loss to SEC East opponents, dating back to the 2006 season.

Western Carolina 

After a slow start, the Dawgs exploded for 42 points in the final three quarters to bounce back with a win over the 1-AA Catamounts. Freshman running back Knowshon Moreno rushed for 94 yards on 13 carries.

Alabama 

In a virtual must-win situation, the Dawgs avoided an 0-2 start in SEC play by escaping Bryant–Denny Stadium with an overtime win. Matthew Stafford connected with senior wide receiver Mikey Henderson on the Bulldogs' first play from scrimmage in OT for the winning score.

(As a footnote, this would be the last game Mark Richt won as head coach of Georgia against the Alabama Crimson Tide, as well as the last time until the 2022 College Football Playoff National Championship that UGA would defeat Alabama.)

Ole Miss 

Running back Thomas Brown rushed for a career-high 180 yds and three touchdowns in the fifth straight win against Western Division opponents.

Tennessee 

Georgia suffered its worst loss since the 2003 Southeastern Conference championship, a 34-13 loss to LSU, and coach Mark Richt's first loss at Tennessee. The Bulldogs had won their last three games at Neyland, Tennessee's home stadium.

Vanderbilt 

Senior kicker Brandon Coutu drilled a 37-yard field goal as time expired to give Georgia its second road win of the season, both coming on the game's final play. The Dawgs outscored Vanderbilt 13-0 in the second half to rally from a 17-7 halftime deficit.

Florida 

Behind Knowshon Moreno's 188 yards (3 touchdowns) and Stafford's 223 yards passing (3 touchdowns), the Dawgs ended their hex against the rival Gators, who had won 15 of the last 17 games in the series. The game was notable for an all team end-zone celebration following Georgia's first touchdown scored on their opening drive.  The team celebration was penalized twice and set the tone for a hard fought game.

Troy 

Knowshon Moreno had another huge game, rushing for 196 yards and three touchdowns, as the Bulldogs avoided a post-Florida hangover with a 10-point win over the pesky Trojans from the Sun Belt.

Auburn 

Georgia had their way in The Deep South's Oldest Rivalry for the second consecutive year behind a balanced offensive attack, with 237 yards passing from Matthew Stafford and 180 combined yards on the ground. The Tigers allowed their most points in a game for the entire season to Georgia for the third straight year. It was also the first game in which the Bulldogs wore their black jerseys.

Kentucky 

The Dawgs had to shake off the rust after falling behind 10-0 early and did just that by scoring 24 of the game's final 27 points to complete the SEC schedule at 6-2. Georgia ran their winning streak over the Wildcats in Athens to 15 games.

Georgia Tech 

Georgia tied a school-record with its seventh-consecutive win in the series of their rivals from Atlanta.  Thomas Brown ran for 139 yards, unlike Moreno, who struggled and left the game with an ankle injury.  The Georgia defense allowed just 12 completions on 32 pass attempts by the Yellow Jackets.

Sugar Bowl 

Georgia controlled both sides of the line of scrimmage and completely outmanned the undefeated Western Athletic Conference champs from the beginning of the game to the end. The Bulldogs' previously unheralded defensive end Marcus Howard dominated the Warrior offensive line and was named the game's Most Valuable Player. This is only the second time a defensive player has been named MVP in the Sugar Bowl's history. The last defensive player to be named MVP was Walt Yowarsky, who played tackle for Kentucky, in 1951.

Source:

Postseason

Final ranking 
The Associated Press final poll lists the Bulldogs ranked 2nd (behind national champion LSU) - the highest ranking since December 6, 1982, and the highest final season ranking since the National Championship year of 1980.  Buoyed by three first place votes, the Bulldogs barely outpaced the third ranked USC program.  2007 marks the eleventh consecutive final AP poll which the Bulldogs ranked in the top 25, the current longest active streak.  The Bulldogs have been ranked 30 times in the final poll including 14 Top-10 and 9 Top-5 rankings.

The final USA Today poll listed the Bulldogs ranked 3rd (behind LSU and USC) – which ties the highest ranking ever in that poll (set in the final 2002 poll).

Players

Coaching staff 
The 2007 Season is Coach Richt's seventh season at Georgia.  Neil Callaway, Georgia's offensive coordinator from 2001 to 2006, left at the end of 2006 to become the head coach at University of Alabama at Birmingham.  Richt named former UGA quarterback Mike Bobo as the new offensive coordinator. Bobo took over play calling responsibilities during the Georgia Tech game as well as in the 2006 Chick-fil-A Bowl.  Callaway also served as the offensive line coach.  Stacy Searels, offensive line coach at LSU from 2003 to 2006, was named to the same position at Georgia to replace Callaway.

References 

Georgia
Georgia Bulldogs football seasons
Sugar Bowl champion seasons
Georgia Bulldogs football